Maragatha Veenai is a 1986 Indian Tamil-language film directed by Gokula Krishnan, starring Suresh and Revathi. It was released on 14 March 1986.

Plot 
Kokila is abandoned as a child and taken in by Carnatic musician who is impressed with her natural singing skills. He and his wife raise her as their own. When her father falls ill, Kokila becomes the sole earner in her family and is forced to go to work. Kokila starts as the new music teacher at a school in a small village. Kannan is the drill master at the same school and is rude to Kokila from their first meeting. Their relationship deteriorates until an injury causes Kannan to repent and apologize for his behavior. The two soon fall in love and Kannan's mother approves of their marriage. Kokila is called back home suddenly and told that her parents have arranged her marriage with Dr. Chandrasekar, the man that saved her father's life. Unable to say no to the people that took her in, she agrees to marry him and breaks things off with Kannan. Things come to a head when Kannan is forced into a marriage by his family and Chandrasekar learns the truth.

Cast 

Suresh as Kannan
Revathi as Kokila
Vagai Chandrasekhar as Dr. Chandrasekar
Goundamani as the school headmaster
Manorama as Agni
Senthil as the school clerk
Kallapetti Singaram as the Thamizh Asiriyar
Sangili Murugan as the town Minor
Vinu Chakravarthy as Kannan's uncle
J. V. Somayajulu as Kokila's adopted father
Vadivukkarasi as Kokila's adopted mother
Baby Sonia as young Kokila

Soundtrack 
The soundtrack was composed by Ilaiyaraaja.

References

External links 
 

1980s Tamil-language films
1986 films
Films directed by Gokula Krishnan
Films scored by Ilaiyaraaja